Carabus marietti mouthiezi is a subspecies of ground beetle from Carabinae subfamily that is endemic to Turkey.

References

marietti mouthiezi
Beetles described in 1991
Beetles of Asia
Endemic fauna of Turkey